"Overnight Celebrity" is the second single from Twista's 2004 album Kamikaze. The song was produced and features uncredited vocals by Kanye West and uncredited violin by Miri Ben-Ari. It contains a sample of the 1978 song "Cause I Love You" By Lenny Williams. The song reached number six on the Billboard Hot 100 on May 11, 2004. The song received a nomination for Best Rap Solo Performance at the 47th Annual Grammy Awards.

Content
The song is about Twista meeting a woman on the street and telling her about all the things he could do for her, while pointing out her looks. He tells the woman he can make her a celebrity overnight.  The song "Prototype" from Outkast is referenced in the song when Twista says "Dre told me you were the prototype". The music video was directed by Erik White and features Israeli violinist Miri Ben-Ari (who played the strings in the record), model Miya Granatella, Bishop Don "Magic" Juan and Chicago rappers Do or Die, Da Brat, Rip, White Boy, Crucial Conflict, and Bump J. While he raps the song's hook, Kanye West did not appear in the video.

In a version shown on BET, "MTV Awards" was muted out due to the Viacom-owned network being competition for the dueling networks.

In popular culture
This song appears in the video games Midnight Club 3: DUB Edition and Saints Row.
In the UK, this song was used in an advert for a four-part BBC documentary Celebrity: A 21st-Century Story, which started airing on BBC Two on 29 December 2020. The programme is available on BBC iPlayer to watch.

Remixes
The official remix was made which features rappers Cam'ron & Bumpy Johnson and an unofficial remix was made which features rappers Cam'ron, 50 Cent & DJ Clue.
Kellee Maize's viral song Google Female Rapper is a freestyle using this song's instrumental.

Charts

Weekly charts

Year-end charts

Certifications

Release history

References

2004 singles
Twista songs
Song recordings produced by Kanye West
Songs written by Kanye West
Songs written by Twista
Music videos directed by Erik White
2004 songs
Atlantic Records singles